Merbes-le-Château is a municipality of Wallonia located in the province of Hainaut, Belgium. 

On January 1, 2006, Merbes-le-Château had a total population of 4,093. The total area is 30.24 km² which gives a population density of 135 inhabitants per km².

The municipality consists of the following districts: Fontaine-Valmont, Labuissière, Merbes-le-Château, and Merbes-Sainte-Marie.

References

External links
 

Municipalities of Hainaut (province)